The Garda Public Order Unit – commonly known as the Garda Riot Squad – is a unit of the Garda Síochána, Ireland's police force, that deals with public disorder, including riots and protests.

Staffing and training
All gardaí assigned to Public Order Units are standard uniformed members assigned to normal policing duties with specialist Public Order training. The unit is trained to use riot control tactics to control, disperse, and arrest civilians that are involved in a riot, demonstration, or protest.

Uniform
Gardaí assigned to Public Order Units typically wear black flame-retardant coveralls, standard issue stab-resistant vests and navy baseball caps with "GARDA" on both the front and back, and "PUBLIC ORDER" along the sides in yellow.

Where there is a heightened risk of violence or attack with burning projectiles, such as Molotov cocktails, stab vests are worn under the coveralls and navy blue riot protection helmets with face shields and protective gloves are worn.

For protection in violent situations, an additional layer of flame-retardant body armor designed for public order use, complete with shoulder pads may be worn along with shin and forearm protectors. In September 2018 the Garda Commissioner was obliged to issue a directive confirming that the Public Order Unit's flame retardant hoods were intended to be worn only when a helmet was also worn - when it was queried why some unit members had worn hoods during a public order policing incident in Dublin.

Equipment
As with ordinary uniformed members of the Garda Síochána, the Public Order Unit do not routinely carry firearms, relying instead on conventional, non-lethal weapons such as pepper spray and batons. Members of the unit typically wear body armour, riot helmets, and carry riot shields. Full-length riot shields are also used during potentially violent confrontations where there is large hostile crowds, or the risk of thrown or flammable projectiles.

In 2016 it was reported that riot gear orders had included contracts for 26-inch batons, riot gloves and boots, and protective flame-retardant clothing. If a situation escalates whereby an armed response is required, the Garda Regional Support Unit (RSU) or Garda Emergency Response Unit (ERU) will be called in to assist.

Vehicles
The Public Order Unit does not operate any specialist armoured vehicles, instead relying on a fleet of refitted commercial vans. These Ford Transit vehicles typically are longer wheelbase versions of the standard Transit van used by gardaí for patrol and lacking a prisoner cage, with Public Order Unit markings.

Formerly, Transit vans were equipped with a raisable and removable windscreen protection cage and removable cages fitted over other windows, however vehicles ordered in 2015 to replace the severely aged 2007 fleet lack these features leaving them open to damage from projectiles.

The DMR South Central Division Public Order Unit, operating from Pearse Street Garda Station, operate a Fiat Ducato van for patrol and public order incidents. This vehicle is used for weekend public order patrols.

Deployment
Typically the unit is only called up for riot situations or pre-planned situations such as major sporting events, protests or large-scale public events such as concerts, St. Patrick's Day or Halloween. In some other cases the Public Order unit has been deployed on more frequent or recurring basis during times of increased risk of disturbances. Examples include the days preceding high-tension international football games, or during the 2016 build-up to the 1916 Centenary celebrations.

Dublin
Two full serials patrol Dublin city center on Friday, Saturday and Sunday nights, providing support to regular patrol Gardaí in situations such as pub brawls, disorderly crowds and excessively violent individuals. One vehicle operates from Pearse Street Garda station on the south side of the River Liffey and one from the Bridewell Garda station, the latter being deployed in response to a violent attack on two uniformed gardaí in the area. Similar resources are deployed across Dublin on Halloween due to a spike in anti-social behaviour, illegal bonfires, attacks against Gardaí and the Dublin Fire Brigade and other related activity.

Notable operations
 In 1995, the unit dealt with rioting English football hooligans (including many members of Combat 18) during a friendly soccer match between the Republic of Ireland and England in Lansdowne Road.
 In 2006, the unit was involved in the 2006 Dublin riots, and were deployed to deal with rioters in Dublin city centre. Some members of the unit were injured during the riots, which lasted several hours.
 In July 2008, members of the unit along with the Air Support Unit and Dog Unit assisted local Gardaí when a feud between two Traveller families broke into a riot in Dalton Park, Mullingar.
 In November 2014, the Public Order Unit were present during a protest against water-charges in Jobstown, Tallaght in which protesters were later 'charged with falsely imprisoning then tánaiste Joan Burton'.

See also
 Territorial Support Group (Metropolitan Police Service)
 Emergency Management and Public Order Unit (Toronto Police Services)

References

Public Order Unit